Jalal Ali bin Ali Al-Ruwishan (born 1965) was the former Interior Minister of the internationally recognised Yemeni government from 9 November 2014 to 2015. In October 2016, he was said to be killed by an airstrike by Saudi warplanes but the Houthis did not say whether Rowaishan was in the building at the time of the attack.

Early life and education
al-Rowaishan was born in 1965 in a village in Khawlan district, west of Sanaa. He started his formal education in a high school in Sanaa and graduated in 1980. He joined the Police College and graduating in 1985. He also holds a Diploma in police Sciences, and Bachelor of Sharia law from the University of Sanaa.

Career
After the unification of Yemen in 1990, he was appointed deputy director general of the Political Security branch in Marib Governorate, and then as general manager, which he served until 2003.

References 

Living people
Interior ministers of Yemen
1965 births
People from Sanaa Governorate
Sanaa University alumni
Bahah Cabinet